Lucas Ezequiel Trecarichi Loiácono (born 12 February 1991) is an Argentine footballer who plays mainly as a left winger.

Club career

Early years / Sevilla
Born in Béccar, Buenos Aires Province, Trecarichi began his career at Club Atlético River Plate, being released in December 2004. In January of the following year, one month before his 14th birthday, he joined CD Leganés, moving to Spain with his parents and soon attracting interest from several clubs in Europe, which prompted the Madrid side to sign him to a five-year contract with a €3 million clause; he often trained with the main squad, but played only with the B-team.

In 2007, the youngster signed for Sevilla FC – as Arsenal was also interested– playing two seasons with the reserves in the second division with little success. Subsequently, Trecarichi was loaned to Club Atlético Huracán for six months, making his top flight debut on 3 September 2009 by coming on as a substitute in a 0–2 loss against Atlético Tucumán; on 7 October he scored his first and only goal for them, in a 2–2 draw at Club Atlético Tigre.

On 24 August 2010, after another spell in Spain, playing four months with lowly SD Ponferradina, Trecarichi moved teams and countries again, joining PFC CSKA Sofia of Bulgaria on a three-year contract. In the summer of 2011, however, he was released by the latter club.

Unión San Felipe / Kallithea
On 16 February 2012, Trecarichi signed with Chilean Primera División side Unión San Felipe as a free agent.

He spent the 2013–14 season in Greece with Kallithea FC, being relatively played as his team finished in eighth position in the second tier.

FC Jūrmala
Prior to the 2014 campaign, Trecarichi joined FC Jūrmala. He scored his first and only league goal on 12 April, in a 4–2 victory over FS METTA/Latvijas Universitāte.

International career
Trecarichi represented Argentina at under-17 and under-20 levels, appearing for the later at the 2009 Toulon Tournament.

References

External links

1991 births
Living people
People from San Isidro Partido
Argentine footballers
Association football wingers
Segunda División players
Segunda División B players
CD Leganés players
Sevilla Atlético players
SD Ponferradina players
Argentine Primera División players
Club Atlético Huracán footballers
First Professional Football League (Bulgaria) players
PFC CSKA Sofia players
Unión San Felipe footballers
Football League (Greece) players
Kallithea F.C. players
FC Jūrmala players
Deportivo Petapa players
Argentina youth international footballers
Argentina under-20 international footballers
Argentine expatriate footballers
Expatriate footballers in Spain
Expatriate footballers in Bulgaria
Expatriate footballers in Chile
Expatriate footballers in Greece
Expatriate footballers in Latvia
Expatriate footballers in Guatemala
Argentine expatriate sportspeople in Spain
Sportspeople from Buenos Aires Province